Greg Chun is an American voice actor and musician who is known for his work in English-dubbed anime and video games.

Personal life
Chun is a native of Chicago, Illinois. He graduated from Stanford University and has found himself in a dilemma in following different types of jobs. Chun is of Korean descent.

He resides in Burbank, California and splits his time between voice acting and music production.

Music 
Chun has produced music on many Lonely Island projects including Saturday Night Live, 67th Annual Emmy Awards, and the Michael Bolton Sexy Valentine's Day Special.

Recognition 
Based on his previous knowledge of the Yakuza video game series franchise, Chun was surprised and pleased to be selected to voice Takayuki Yagami in the English-language version of the 2018 spinoff Judgment. Yagami's voice was meant to make him sound like a "bona fide badass" regardless of language, something the localization team believed they succeeded at. Chun found his work on the game gratifying, saying, "it really did require me to let go of the tricks that you use to push a performance through, and I really did need to fall back on authenticity and genuine groundedness". Chun found staying faithful to the spirit of the Japanese version challenging but enjoyed portraying Yagami's blend of seriousness and comedy. He said having to scream in certain parts of the game was difficult. Chun was surprised by the depth of Yagami's character arc, considering his work on the game an unforgettable experience. He found the character easy to connect with because of his realistic characterization.

Greg Chun's performance as Yagami was praised by The Hollywood Reporter and Game Informer EGM Now agreed, believing Chun made a more striking performance than Takuya Kimura, who the writer did not find suitable for the character.  RPGamer praised both Kimura and Chun's performances as Yagami.

Filmography

Anime

Film

Television

Animation

Video games

Other

References

External links 
Greg Chun's official website

Living people
American male actors of Korean descent
American male musicians
American male video game actors
American male voice actors
Place of birth missing (living people)
Stanford University alumni
Twitch (service) streamers
21st-century American male actors
Year of birth missing (living people)